Sergey Dmitrievich Leonov (born 9 May 1983) is a Russian politician from the ultranationalist Liberal Democratic Party. He has represented Roslavl constituency in the State Duma since the 2021 election.

On 20 April 2022, during Russian war against Ukraine, he proposed to forcibly take blood from Ukrainian war prisoners.

References 

1983 births
Living people
People from Suvorovsky District
Liberal Democratic Party of Russia politicians
Eighth convocation members of the State Duma (Russian Federation)